Astolfo Petrazzi (1583–1665) was an Italian painter of the Baroque period, active mainly in his hometown of Siena, but also Spoleto and Rome. He was a pupil of mainly Francesco Vanni, but also worked under Ventura Salimbeni and Pietro Sorri. He died in Siena.

Works
Ascension (Ascensione), Museo dell'Opera del Duomo, Siena Cathedral
Communion of San Girolamo, Sant'Agostino, Siena
Conversion of St Paul, Chiesa della Carceri di Sant'Ansano, Siena
Christian Bishop of Magonza concede a Siena alcune franchigie per conto del Barbarossa (1627), Palazzo Pubblico, Siena
Eternal Father and Saints John, Hippolyte and Bernard, Basilica di San Francesco, Siena
Immaculate Conception, Chiesa e Convento di Sant'Agostino, Pietrasanta
La Madonna and the Plague of Siena, San Clemente in Basilica of Santa Maria dei Servi, Siena
La Pietà and Saints Giovanni Evangelista, Bernardino e Tommaso, Santa Maria della Scala, Sala di San Pio (St. Pius Hall), Siena
Lady and St John the Baptist (1644), Santi Simone e Giuda Collegiate, Radicondoli
Madonna del Rosario with the Blessed Franco da Grotti and Saints Domenico, Giovanni Battista, Orsola, Caterina da Siena, Lucia, Museo d'Arte Sacra della Val d'Arbia, ("museum of religious art of the Val d'Arbia"), Buonconvento
Martyrdom of Saint Bartholomgew (1644), San Bartolomeo ad Ancaiano, Sovicille
Martyrdom of Saint Crescentius (1639), Palazzo Pubblico, Siena
Martyrdom of Saint Sebastian, fresco in San Sebastiano in Valle Piatta, Siena
Miracle of St Cerbo, Museo delle Biccherne, Siena City Archives
Return of the Prodigal Son, Palazzo Chigi-Piccolomini alla Postierla, Siena
St Giacomo restores vision to a blind man, Questura, Siena
St Joseph in Glory (1639), Palazzo Pubblico, Siena
St Sebastian, Scarlatti Hall, Palazzo Chigi-Saracini, Siena
Santa Caterina che dà la veste al povero, Chiesa della Compagnia di Santa Caterina della Misericordia, Serre di Rapolano
Santa Caterina receives the heart of Christ Redeemer, Chiesa della Compagnia di Santa Caterina della Misericordia, Rapolano Serre, Rapolano Terme
Santi Biagio, Domenico, Caterina da Siena e Sebastiano in adorazione della Madonna col Bambino, Chiesa di San Fortunato a Murlo im Castello/Borgo Murlo, Murlo
Lute player, Pinacoteca Nazionale di SienaGlory of San Giobbe (1648), Oratorio di San Rocco, Siena, worked with Francesco Bertini

References

Piero Torriti: Tutta Siena. Contrada per Contrada (All About Siena''. Edizioni Bonechi, Florence 2004, 

1583 births
17th-century deaths
16th-century Italian painters
Italian male painters
17th-century Italian painters
Painters from Siena
Italian Baroque painters